Margie Orford (born 30 September 1964) is a South African journalist, film director and author of crime fiction, children's fiction, non-fiction and school text books.

Biography
Orford was born in London and grew up in Namibia and South Africa.  She was detained during the 1985 State of Emergency while a student at the University of Cape Town, taking her final examinations in prison. After travelling widely, she studied under J. M. Coetzee before embarking on a career in publishing in the newly emerged Namibia. She returned to live in South Africa in 2001.

Works

Crime fiction

Children's fiction

Non-fiction

School textbooks

Journalism

References

External links
 Margie Orford's website.
 Margie Orford's profile at Jonathan Ball Publishers.
 Margie Orford's profile at Blake Friedmann Literary Agency.
 Margie Orford on Twitter.

1964 births
Living people
South African crime fiction writers
South African educators
South African women novelists
 Crime fiction writers